Dorothy "Dottie" Peoples (born August 12, 1950) is an American gospel singer from Dayton, Ohio. After completing high school, she toured with gospel pioneer Dorothy Norwood, a member of the Caravans. After a stint in jazz, she relocated to Atlanta in 1979, and returned to her gospel roots. She has been dubbed "Songbird of the South."

Career 
Peoples performed with Widespread Panic at the inaugural Bonnaroo Music Festival and with Dorothy Norwood. She sang "The Star-Spangled Banner" at the 1996 Olympics, "He's an On Time God" at the memorial service for John Lewis, and at the 2020 Stellar Awards.

Peoples has an honorary Doctor of Sacred Music from the Global Evangelical Christian College, part of the International Circle of Faith Colleges and Seminaries network. She has toured regularly with her friend Garnelle Hubbard-Spearman.

Discography
Surely God Is Able (Church Door, 1984) – 37 weeks on [[Billboard chart|Billboards Top Gospel Albums chart]], peaking at #17 on June 8, 1984
Is It Worth It All? (Church Door, 1987)
Live at Salem Baptist Church (Atlanta International, 1993)
Christmas With Dottie (Atlanta International, 1995)
Live: Featuring "On time God" (Atlanta International, 1995) – 112 weeks on Billboards Top Gospel Albums chart, peaking at #3 on February 2, 1996 
Count on God, Live (Atlanta International, 1996)
Testify (Atlanta International, 1997) – 47 weeks on Billboards Top Gospel Albums chart, peaking at #14 on August 22, 1997
The Collection: Songs of Love & Faith (Atlanta International, 1998) – 1 week on ''Billboards Top Gospel Albums chart, peaking at #38 on August 21, 1998God Can & God Will (Atlanta International, 1999) – 66 weeks on Billboards Top Gospel Albums chart, peaking at #8 on September 10, 1999Show Up and Show Out (Atlanta International, 2000) – 31 weeks on Billboards Top Gospel Albums chart, peaking at #10 on February 2, 2001Churchin' with Dottie (Atlanta International, 2002) – 80 weeks on Billboard's Top Gospel Albums chart, peaking at #10 on November 8, 2002; 56 weeks on Billboard's Top R&B/Hip-hop Albums chart, peaking at #49 on August 29, 2003The Water I Give (Atlanta International, 2003)Live In Memphis – He Said It (AIR Gospel, 2005) – 1 week on Billboards Top Gospel Albums chart, peaking at #50 on July 15, 2015
Do It! (DP Muzik Group / Comin Atcha Music, Inc., 2008) – 13 weeks on Billboard'''s Top Gospel Albums chart, peaking at #13 on October 10, 2008I Got This: Live! (DP Muzik Group, 2013) – 10 weeks on Billboards Top Gospel Albums chart, peaking at #14 on February 22, 2013

Awards

References

External links
 

1950 births
Living people
African-American Christians
American Pentecostals
American gospel singers
Musicians from Dayton, Ohio